Pentacyanocyclopentadiene is a derivative of cyclopentadiene with five cyano groups with the molecular formula C5H(CN)5.  The corresponding anion, pentacyanocyclopentadienide, is a ligand with the molecular formula . In contrast to other anions based on a C5 ring unit it binds to metals through the pendant cyano groups rather than the C5 ring. The anion was first synthesised by Webster in the 1960s and its conjugate acid much later on. More recently Wright has discovered its extensive coordination chemistry.  By virtue of a combination of mesomeric and aromatic stabilization of its anion, pentacyanocyclopentadiene is a superacid, with an estimated aqueous pKa of −11.  The free acid was prepared by Reed in 2004 and was assigned a polymeric structure with protons that bridge planar C5(CN)5 units.

Synthesis
Pentacyanocyclopentadiene is synthesised by coupling carbon disulfide and sodium cyanide in dimethylformamide before oxidation using ammonium persulfate and final purification generates the ammonium pentacyanocyclopentadiene salt. Further reaction with sodium hydride generates NaC5(CN)5 which is a starting point for its coordination chemistry with transition metals.

Reactions and coordination chemistry
Coupling of sodium pentacyanocyclopentadiene (NaC5(CN)5) with transition metal halide salts generates metal complexes containing the  anion.
Because the anion binds to metals through the cyanide group it can act as a pentagonal node. Thus it can form fullerene-like structures with large voids containing solvent. This has important implications for gas storage and separation.

References

Nitriles
Cyclopentadienes